Geller I was a Modernist house in Lawrence, New York. The house was one of the first American works by architect Marcel Breuer, designed in 1945. It was demolished in 2022. It was one of the first to employ Breuer's concept of the 'binuclear' house, with separate wings for the bedrooms and for the living / dining / kitchen area, separated by an entry hall, and with the distinctive 'butterfly' roof (two opposing roof surfaces sloping towards the middle, centrally drained) that became part of the popular modernist style vocabulary.

The house was eligible for the National Register of Historic Places as a contributing property in the Rockaway Hunt Historic District.

References

Marcel Breuer buildings
Modernist architecture in New York (state)
Five Towns
1945 in New York (state)
Buildings and structures demolished in 2022
Buildings and structures completed in 1945